The following is an alphabetical list of articles related to the U.S. state of New Jersey.

0–9 

.nj.us – Internet second-level domain for the state of New Jersey
3rd State to ratify the Constitution of the United States
500-series county routes in New Jersey
2006 New Jersey state government shutdown

A
Abramoff, Jack
Action Park
Adjacent states:

Agriculture in New Jersey
Airports in New Jersey
American Conference on Diversity
American Revolutionary War
Amusement parks in New Jersey
Andros, Edmund
Appalachian Mountains
Appalachian Trail
Aquaria in New Jersey
commons:Category:Aquaria in New Jersey
Arboreta in New Jersey
commons:Category:Arboreta in New Jersey
Archaeology of New Jersey
:Category:Archaeological sites in New Jersey
commons:Category:Archaeological sites in New Jersey
Architecture of New Jersey
Area codes in New Jersey
Art museums and galleries in New Jersey
commons:Category:Art museums and galleries in New Jersey
Arthur Kill
Asbury Park
Association of New Jersey Chiropractors
Astronomical observatories in New Jersey
commons:Category:Astronomical observatories in New Jersey
Atlantic City, New Jersey
Atlantic City
Atlantic City Expressway
Atlantic Ocean

B
Baby It's You
Bamberger, Louis
Barclay, Robert
Barnegat Bay
Barton, Clara
Basie, William "Count"
Bass River
Battle of Monmouth
Battle of Princeton
Battle of Trenton
Bayonne
Bayonne Bridge
Beaches of New Jersey
commons:Category:Beaches of New Jersey
A Beautiful Mind
Bell Labs
Benny (Jersey Shore insult)
Berkeley College
Bernard, Francis
Bloomfield College
Bon Jovi
Bon Jovi, Jon
Border between West Jersey and East Jersey
Boroughitis
Botanical gardens in New Jersey
commons:Category:Botanical gardens in New Jersey
Boyden, Seth
Bradley, Bill
Breschi, Gaetano
Branch Brook Park
Buildings and structures in New Jersey
commons:Category:Buildings and structures in New Jersey
Burlington, capital of the Colony of West Jersey 1673–1688, capital of the Province of West Jersey 1689–1702, co-capital of the Province of New-Jersey 1702–1776, co-capital of the State of New Jersey 1776-1784
Burnet, William
Burr, Aaron
Burr, Aaron
Byrne, Brendan

C

Cahill, William T.
Calder, Alexander
Caldwell College
Camden
Camden Central Airport
Camden Riversharks
Cape May (promontory)
Cape May (town)
Cape May-Lewes Ferry
Capital of the State of New Jersey
Capitol of the State of New Jersey
commons:Category:New Jersey State Capitol
Emilio Carranza
George Carteret
Casinos in New Jersey
Castle Point
Castle Point Park
Cathedral of the Sacred Heart
Census statistical areas in New Jersey
Centenary College
Central Jersey
Church Square Park
Cities in New Jersey
Clam Broth House
Cleveland, Grover
Climate of New Jersey
Climate change in New Jersey 
Clinton Road
CNBC
Codey, Richard
Cohansey River
The College of New Jersey
College of Saint Elizabeth
Colleges and universities in New Jersey
Columbus Park
Communications in New Jersey
commons:Category:Communications in New Jersey
CONRAIL
Cooke, Martin
Cooper, James Fenimore
Corzine, Jon
Counties of the State of New Jersey
Crane, Stephen
Crossings of the Raritan River
Cuisine of New Jersey
Culture of New Jersey
commons:Category:New Jersey culture
Cunningham, Glenn

D
Delaware Bay
Delaware River
Delaware River and Bay Authority
Delaware River Port Authority
Delaware & Raritan Canal
Delaware Valley
Delaware Water Gap
Demographics of New Jersey
Deptford
Deptford Mall
The Devil's Tree
Drew University
Driscoll, Alfred E.
Driscoll Bridge
Dutch West India Company

E
East Jersey
East Orange
Economy of New Jersey
:Category:Economy of New Jersey
commons:Category:Economy of New Jersey
Edge, Walter E.
Edison
Edison Records
Edison, Charles
Edison, Thomas
Education in New Jersey
:Category:Education in New Jersey
commons:Category:Education in New Jersey
Einstein, Albert
Elections in the State of New Jersey
:Category:New Jersey elections
commons:Category:New Jersey elections
Elizabethtown, New-Jersey now Elizabeth, New Jersey, colonial capital 1665-1673
Ellis Island
Environment of New Jersey
commons:Category:Environment of New Jersey

F

Fairleigh Dickinson University
Felician College
Fenwick, Millicent
Festivals in New Jersey
commons:Category:Festivals in New Jersey
Finns Point
Flag of the State of New Jersey
Florio, James
Anne Flournoy
Forbes, Malcolm
Forts in New Jersey
Fort Dix
Fort Lee
:Category:Forts in New Jersey
commons:Category:Forts in New Jersey
Foster, Stephen
Frank Sinatra Park
Franklin, William

G

Garden State
Garden State Parkway
Gary Brolsma
Gateway National Recreation Area
Gateway Park
Geography of New Jersey
:Category:Geography of New Jersey
commons:Category:Geography of New Jersey
Geology of New Jersey
:Category:Geology of New Jersey
commons:Category:Geology of New Jersey
George Washington Bridge
Georgian Court College
Ghost towns in New Jersey
:Category:Ghost towns in New Jersey
commons:Category:Ghost towns in New Jersey
Giants Stadium
Ginsberg, Allen
Glacial Lake Passaic
Goethals Bridge
Goldman Sachs Tower
Golf clubs and courses in New Jersey
Government of the State of New Jersey  website
:Category:Government of New Jersey
commons:Category:Government of New Jersey
Governor of the State of New Jersey
List of governors of New Jersey
Great Egg Harbor River
Great Falls of the Passaic River
Great Seal of the State of New Jersey
Greetings from Asbury Park, N.J.
Gunn, Sakia

H
Hackensack River
Hackensack River Canoe & Kayak Club
Haddonfield
Haddon Heights
Hague, Frank
Haines, Daniel
Hambletonian
Hamilton, Alexander
Hamilton, Andrew
Hart, John
Hauptmann, Bruno
Healy, Jerramiah
High Point
High schools in New Jersey
Highway routes in New Jersey
Hiking trails in New Jersey
commons:Category:Hiking trails in New Jersey
Hindenburg disaster
History of New Jersey
Historical outline of New Jersey
Hoboken
Hoboken election of 2005
Hoboken Island
Hoboken Parks Initiative
Hoboken Tea Building Walkway
Hoffman, Harold G.
Holland Tunnel
Hopkinson, Francis
Holmdel Horn Antenna
Hospitals in New Jersey
Hot springs of New Jersey
commons:Category:Hot springs of New Jersey
Hudson, Henry
Hudson-Bergen Light Rail
Hudson County
Hudson River
Hughes, Richard J.

I
Images of New Jersey
commons:Category:New Jersey
Institute for Advanced Study
Interstate 78
Interstate 80
Interstate 95
Interstate 278
Interstate 280
Interstate 287
Ironbound
Islands of New Jersey
Italian-Americans
Izod Center (known as the Continental Airlines Arena until October 2007)

J
Jackson Street Park
Jackson Whites
James, Duke of York
Jersey Boys
Jersey City
Jersey Devil
Jersey Dutch
Jersey Shore
John, Lord Berkeley
Johns, Michael
Jungle Habitat

K
Kean, Thomas
Kean, Thomas Jr.
Kean University
Keith, Brian
Kingda Ka
Kingsland Explosion

L
Lackawanna Cut-Off
Lakes of New Jersey
Lake Hopatcong
commons:Category:Lakes of New Jersey
Landmarks in New Jersey
commons:Category:Landmarks in New Jersey
Latifah, Queen
Lautenberg, Frank R.
Law enforcement agencies in New Jersey
Lenape
Lenapehoking
Liberty Science Center
Liberty State Park
Lincoln Highway
Lincoln Tunnel
Lindbergh, Charles
Lindbergh kidnapping
Lists related to the State of New Jersey:
List of airports in New Jersey
List of bridges documented by the Historic American Engineering Record in New Jersey
List of bridges on the National Register of Historic Places in New Jersey
List of census statistical areas in New Jersey
List of cities in New Jersey
List of colleges and universities in New Jersey
List of counties in New Jersey
List of crossings of the Raritan River
List of 500-series county routes in New Jersey
List of dams and reservoirs in New Jersey
List of forts in New Jersey
List of ghost towns in New Jersey
List of governors of New Jersey
List of high schools in New Jersey
List of highway routes in New Jersey
List of hospitals in New Jersey
List of individuals executed in New Jersey
List of islands of New Jersey
List of lakes of New Jersey
List of law enforcement agencies in New Jersey
List of mayors of Hoboken, New Jersey
List of movies set in New Jersey
List of municipalities in New Jersey (by population)
List of museums in New Jersey
List of National Historic Landmarks in New Jersey
List of newspapers in New Jersey
List of people from Jersey City, New Jersey
List of people from New Jersey
List of power stations in New Jersey
List of radio stations in New Jersey
List of railroads in New Jersey
List of Registered Historic Places in New Jersey
List of rivers of New Jersey
List of school districts in New Jersey
List of state forests in New Jersey
List of state parks in New Jersey
List of state prisons in New Jersey
List of symbols of the State of New Jersey
List of telephone area codes in New Jersey
List of television stations in New Jersey
List of United States congressional delegations from New Jersey
List of United States congressional districts in New Jersey
List of United States representatives from New Jersey
List of United States senators from New Jersey
Livingston, William
Lombardi, Vince
Lower New York Bay
Lucent Technologies
Lucy the Elephant

M
Madison Park
Maps of New Jersey
commons:Category:Maps of New Jersey
Marine Academy of Science and Technology
Marineview Plaza
Maurice River
Mayors of Hoboken, New Jersey
McClellan, George Brinton
McGreevey, James
Meadowlands Racetrack
Meadowlands Sports Complex
Menlo Park
MetLife Stadium
MetroStars
Meyner, Robert B.
Miss America
Monmouth University
Monopoly (game)
Montclair State University
Monuments and memorials in New Jersey
commons:Category:Monuments and memorials in New Jersey
Moore, A. Harry
Morris Canal
Morris, Lewis
Morristown
Mountains of New Jersey
commons:Category:Mountains of New Jersey
Movies set in New Jersey
Mullica River
Municipalities in New Jersey by population
Musconetcong River
Museums in New Jersey
:Category:Museums in New Jersey
commons:Category:Museums in New Jersey
Music of New Jersey
:Category:Music of New Jersey
commons:Category:Music of New Jersey
:Category:Musical groups from New Jersey
:Category:Musicians from New Jersey
My Chemical Romance

N
Namesake of the State of New Jersey - Bailiwick of Jersey, Channel Islands, United Kingdom
Nash, John Forbes
Nast, Thomas
National Historic Landmarks in New Jersey
Natural history of New Jersey
commons:Category:Natural history of New Jersey
Nature centers in New Jersey
commons:Category:Nature centers in New Jersey
Navesink River
Newark, New Jersey
Newark Bay
Newark Bay Bridge
Newark Bears
Newark City Subway
Newark Liberty International Airport
New Brunswick
New Jersey  website
:Category:New Jersey
commons:Category:New Jersey
commons:Category:Maps of New Jersey
New Jersey Athletic Conference
New Jersey Association for Infant Mental Health
New Jersey Cardinals
New Jersey census statistical areas
New Jersey City University
New Jersey Detective Agency
New Jersey Devils
New Jersey films
New Jersey Folklore Society
New Jersey Generals
New Jersey Gladiators SC
New Jersey Hall of Fame
New Jersey Institute of Technology
New Jersey Legislature
New Jersey Lightning
New Jersey locations by per capita income
New Jersey Meadowlands
New Jersey Music Hall of Fame
New Jersey Nets
New Jersey Palisades
New Jersey Sports and Exposition Authority
New Jersey State Capitol
New Jersey State House
New Jersey State Police
New Jersey Surcharge
New Jersey: The Movie
New Jersey Transit
New Jersey Turnpike
New Jersey Youth Theatre
New Netherland
New York-Newark-Bridgeport, NY-NJ-CT-PA Combined Statistical Area
New York-Northern New Jersey-Long Island, NY-NJ-PA Metropolitan Statistical Area
Newport Tower
Newport Centre Mall
Newspapers in New Jersey
New Sweden
New York Giants
New York Harbor
New York Jets
Nicholson, Jack
Nitro (Six Flags Great Adventure)
NJ – United States Postal Service postal code for the State of New Jersey
North Jersey

O
Ocean City
Ocean Grove
Outdoor sculptures in New Jersey
commons:Category:Outdoor sculptures in New Jersey
Outerbridge Crossing
Overpeck Creek

P
Palace Amusements
Passaic
Passaic River
Paterson
Paterson, William
PATH
Penn, William
Penzias, Arno
People from Jersey City, New Jersey
People from New Jersey
:Category:People from New Jersey
commons:Category:People from New Jersey
:Category:People by city in New Jersey
:Category:People from New Jersey by occupation
Pequannock River
Perth Amboy, capital of the Colony of East Jersey 1673–1688, capital of the Province of East Jersey 1689–1702, co-capital of the Province of New-Jersey 1702–1776, co-capital of the State of New Jersey 1776-1784
Philadelphia-Camden-Vineland, PA-NJ-DE-MD Combined Statistical Area
Philadelphia-Camden-Wilmington, PA-NJ-DE-MD Metropolitan Statistical Area
Pier A
Pine Barrens
The Pingry School
Pitcher, Molly
Pohatcong Creek
Pohatcong Mountain
Politics of New Jersey
:Category:Politics of New Jersey
commons:Category:Politics of New Jersey
Pompton River
Port Authority of New York and New Jersey
PATCO
Port Newark-Elizabeth Marine Terminal
Port Reading
Pride Connections Center
Princeton, New Jersey
Princeton University
Protected areas of New Jersey
commons:Category:Protected areas of New Jersey
Province of New Jersey
PSE&G
Pulaski Skyway

Q
Quakers

R
Radio stations in New Jersey
Railroads in New Jersey
Ramapo River
Ramapo Mountains
Ramapo Mountain Indians
Raritan (tribe)
Raritan Bay
Raritan River
Red Bank
Registered Historic Places in New Jersey
Reines, Frederick
Religion in New Jersey
:Category:Religion in New Jersey
commons:Category:Religion in New Jersey
Stockton University
Rider University
Rockaway River
Rivers in New Jersey
Roberts, David
Roebling, John A.
Roller coasters in New Jersey
commons:Category:Roller coasters in New Jersey
Roth, Philip
Rowan University
Russo, Anthony
Rutgers University

S
Safe Corridor
Saint Peter's University
Salem River
Sandy Hook
Sandy Hook Bay
Savoy Records
School districts in New Jersey
Schultz, Dutch
Scouting in New Jersey
Seal of New Jersey
Seton Hall University
Settlements in New Jersey
Cities in New Jersey
Towns in New Jersey
Villages in New Jersey
Townships in New Jersey
Census Designated Places in New Jersey
Other unincorporated communities in New Jersey
List of ghost towns in New Jersey
Seven Mile Island
Shades Of Death Road
Shrewsbury River
Sinatra, Frank
Six Flags Great Adventure
Ski areas and resorts in New Jersey
commons:Category:Ski areas and resorts in New Jersey
Smith, Kevin
Smith, Patti
Society for the Establishment of Useful Manufactures
Solar power in New Jersey
The Sopranos
South Orange
South Jersey
South Mountain Reservation
Sports in New Jersey
commons:Category:Sports in New Jersey
Sports venues in New Jersey
commons:Category:Sports venues in New Jersey
Springsteen, Bruce
State forests in New Jersey
State of New Jersey  website
Government of the State of New Jersey
:Category:Government of New Jersey
commons:Category:Government of New Jersey
State parks in New Jersey
State Police of New Jersey
State prisons in New Jersey
Stevens Institute of Technology
Stevens, John
Stone Pony
Structures in New Jersey
commons:Category:Buildings and structures in New Jersey
Stuyvesant, Peter
Superfund sites in New Jersey
Swit, Loretta
Sybil's Cave
Symbols of the State of New Jersey
:Category:Symbols of New Jersey
commons:Category:Symbols of New Jersey

T
Telecommunications in New Jersey
commons:Category:Communications in New Jersey
Telephone area codes in New Jersey
Television stations in New Jersey
Terrace Pond
Teterboro Airport
Theatres in New Jersey
commons:Category:Theatres in New Jersey
Theta Networks
Thomas Edison State College
Tillie, murals
Toms River (river)
Toms River (village)
Tourism in New Jersey  website
commons:Category:Tourism in New Jersey
Transportation in New Jersey
:Category:Transportation in New Jersey
commons:Category:Transport in New Jersey
Trenton, New Jersey, state capital since 1784, national capital 1784
Trenton Thunder
Trump, Donald
Tuckahoe River
Battle of Turtle Gut Inlet

U
Union Hotel
United Airlines Flight 93
United States of America
States of the United States of America
United States Attorney for the District of New Jersey
United States census statistical areas of New Jersey
United States congressional delegations from New Jersey
United States congressional districts in New Jersey
United States Court of Appeals for the Third Circuit
United States District Court for the District of New Jersey
United States representatives from New Jersey
United States senators from New Jersey
United Water
Universities and colleges in New Jersey
University of Medicine and Dentistry of New Jersey
Upper New York Bay
U.S. Route 1 in New Jersey
U.S. Route 9 in New Jersey
U.S. Route 30 in New Jersey
U.S. Route 40 in New Jersey
U.S. Route 46
US-NJ – ISO 3166-2:US region code for the State of New Jersey
USS New Jersey

V
Verrazzano, Giovanni da
Vezzetti, Thomas
Vehicle registration plates of New Jersey

W
The War of the Worlds
Washington, George
Watchung Mountains
Water parks in New Jersey
Waterfalls of New Jersey
commons:Category:Waterfalls of New Jersey
Wawayanda State Park
Weehawken
Weehawken Cove
Weird NJ
West Jersey
West Orange
Weston, Edward
The Wetlands Institute
Wharton State Forest
Whitman, Christine Todd
Whitman, Walt
Wheaton Industries
Wikimedia
Wikimedia Commons:Category:New Jersey
commons:Category:Maps of New Jersey
Wikinews:Category:New Jersey
Wikinews:Portal:New Jersey
Wikipedia Category:New Jersey
Wikipedia Portal:New Jersey
Wikipedia:WikiProject New Jersey
:Category:WikiProject New Jersey articles
:Category:WikiProject New Jersey participants
William Paterson University
Williams, William Carlos
Wilson, Robert
Wilson, Woodrow
Wind power in New Jersey
Witherspoon, John
Woodrow Wilson School of Public and International Affairs
World Trade Center bombing

X

Y
Yousef, Ramzi

Z
Zoos in New Jersey
commons:Category:Zoos in New Jersey

See also

Topic overview:
New Jersey
Outline of New Jersey

New Jersey
 
New Jersey